Alexander Matveyevich Matrosov ( February 5, 1924 – February 27, 1943) was a Soviet infantry soldier during the Second World War, posthumously awarded the title of the Hero of the Soviet Union for blocking a German machine-gun with his body.

His official Soviet biography states he was  born in Yekaterinoslav (now Dnipro). However an evidence emerged that both his name an place of birth were invented by him while he was a street child. There are several versions about his origins.

Acts of bravery

Matrosov was a private in the 2nd Separate Rifle Battalion of the 91st Independent Siberian Volunteer Brigade, later renamed and the 254th Rifle Regiment and reorganized within the 56th Guards Rifle Division of the Soviet Army. He was armed with a light machine-gun.

On 23 and 24 February 1943, in the battle to recapture village of Chernushki, near Velikiye Luki, currently in Loknyansky District, Pskov Oblast, the Soviet forces struggled to take a German heavy machine-gun, housed within a concrete pillbox, which blocked the route to the village. It had already claimed the lives of many of the Red Army troops. Matrosov crept up to the pillbox and released a burst of rounds into the slot in the pillbox. One round hit a mine inside, and the machine-gun temporarily fell silent. It restarted a few minutes later. At this point Matrosov physically pulled himself up and jammed his body into the slot, wholly blocking the fire at his comrades but clearly at the cost of his own life. This allowed his unit to advance and capture the pillbox and thereafter retake the village.

For his self-sacrifice in battle, Matrosov was posthumously awarded the distinction Hero of the Soviet Union and the Order of Lenin.

Stalin officially renamed his regiment the Matrosov Regiment.

According to one of versions Alexander Matrosov was actually of a Bashkir ethnic minority and his real name Shakiryan Muhammedyanov was Russified.

0n 5 January 2023, the day after the monument to Matrosov in his place of birth Dnipro, Ukraine (then Yekaterinoslav, USSR) was dismantled in as part of the derussification and decommunization campaigns following the 2022 Russian invasion of Ukraine, Mayor of Dnipro Borys Filatov claimed that Matrosov had never been to Yekaterinoslav but he had pretended to be born there so that he looked like a Russian person in Soviet documents. Filatov also stated that Matrosov was actually of Bashkir ethnicity.

Similar cases
On August 6, 1942 in the battle on the river Don an ethnic Kyrgyz soldier of the Red Army  similarly used his body to cover a German pillbox machine-gun.

According to Beijing People's Daily, Matrosov's tale also inspired Huang Jiguang, a famous Chinese revolutionary martyr, to perform a similar feat during the Korean War.

During the First Indochina War, in Battle of Dien Bien Phu. A Viet Minh soldier named  sacrificed his life to fill the machine gun bunker of the French army to create opportunities for teammates to advance.

In popular culture

Matrosov is the main character a number of books and of the 1947 war film, Private Alexander Matrosov (Рядовой Александр Матросов), directed by Leonid Lukov.

References

External links
Image
A monument to Alexander Matrosov,  Moskovsky park of Victory, St. Petersburg

Heroes of the Soviet Union
Recipients of the Order of Lenin
Soviet military personnel killed in World War II
1924 births
1943 deaths
Military personnel from Dnipro